The 1953 LSU Tigers football team represented Louisiana State University (LSU) as a member of the Southeastern Conference during the 1953 college football season. Led by sixth-year head coach Gaynell Tinsley, the Tigers compiling an overall record of 5–3–3 with a mark of 2–3–3 in conference play, placing eighth in the SEC.

Schedule

Personnel

Coaching staff

Roster

References

LSU
LSU Tigers football seasons
LSU Tigers football